Alex Mellemgaard (born 27 November 1991) is a Faroese international footballer who plays as a left back.

Career
He has played club football for Argja Bóltfelag and B36 Tórshavn. 

He made his international debut for the Faroe Islands in 2018.

References

1991 births
Living people
Faroese footballers
Faroe Islands international footballers
Argja Bóltfelag players
B36 Tórshavn players
Association football fullbacks